The 2017–18 season was the 113th season of competitive football in Turkey.

Pre-season

League tables

Süper Lig

1.Lig

Turkish Cup

Teams seeded for the group stages: Konyaspor (defending champions), Beşiktaş (1st in the Süper Lig), İstanbul Başakşehir (2nd), and Fenerbahçe (3rd).
Teams seeded for the play-off round: Galatasaray (4th in the Süper Lig), Antalyaspor (5th), Trabzonspor (6th), Akhisar Belediyespor (7th), Gençlerbirliği (8th), Kasımpaşa S.K. (10th), Kardemir Karabükspor (11th), Alanyaspor (12th), Osmanlıspor (13th), Bursaspor (14th), Kayserispor (15th), Sivasspor (1.Lig champions), Yeni Malatyaspor (1.Lig runners-up), and Göztepe (promoted from the 1.Lig)
Teams seeded for the second round: Çaykur Rizespor (16th in the Süper Lig), Gaziantepspor (17th), Adanaspor (18th), Eskişehirspor (3rd in the 1.Lig), Boluspor (4th), Giresunspor (6th), Altınordu (7th), Ümraniyespor (8th), Balıkesirspor (9th), Elazığspor (10th), Denizlispor (11th), Manisaspor (12th), Gaziantep B.B. (13th), Adana Demirspor (14th), Samsunspor (15th), Şanlıurfaspor (16th in the 1.Lig), Bandırmaspor (17th), Mersin İdman Yurdu (18th),

Final

National team

Friendlies

2018 FIFA World Cup qualification

Turkish clubs in Europe

UEFA Champions League

Third qualifying round

|}

Play-off round

|}

Group stage

Group G

Round of 16

|}

UEFA Europa League

Second qualifying round

|}

Third qualifying round

|}

Play-off round

|}

Group stage

Group C

Group I

References

 
Seasons in Turkish football
Turkish 2017